Minuscule 585 (in the numbering Gregory-Aland) ε 125 (von Soden) is an illuminated Byzantine Gospel Book. It is dated paleographically to the late 10th century.

Description 

The manuscript contains the four Christian Gospels. Originally there were Evangelist portraits at the beginning of each Gospel, but the portrait of Luke is lost. The text is written on 300 parchment leaves, in one column per page, 20 lines per page.

There is also a division according to the Ammonian Sections (in Mark 233 Sections, the last in 16:8), with a references to the Eusebian Canons (written below Ammonian Section numbers). It contains liturgical books (Synaxarion, Menologion) and portraits of the Evangelists.

The manuscript is an example of the art during the Macedonian Renaissance.

Text 

The Greek text of the codex is a representative of the Byzantine text-type. Aland placed it in Category V.
Hermann von Soden classified it to the textual family Family Kx. It was examined by the Claremont Profile Method.

History 
It is dated by the INTF to the 10th century.

The manuscript was in Venice in 1560, and was probably purchased by Duke Alfonso II d'Este. It was moved to Vienna in 1589 by Francesco d'Este. In 1868 it was returned to Italy under the provisions of the Convention of Florence.

Currently it is housed at the Biblioteca Estense (Gr. I) at Modena.

See also 

 List of New Testament minuscules
 Biblical manuscript
 Textual criticism

References

Further reading 

 Crinelli, Lorenzo. Treasures from Italy's Great Libraries. New York, The Vendome Press, 1997.

Greek New Testament minuscules
10th-century biblical manuscripts
10th-century illuminated manuscripts
Illuminated biblical manuscripts
Biblioteca Estense
Este collection